is a yuri manga of the Class S by , which runs in the monthly shoujo magazine Ribon.

Plot 
Two very different girls meet in the same class. They are outgoing, athletic Ayumu Kurihara and pale, quiet Misuzu Tsukishima. After Ayumu cracks through Misuzu's self-imposed alienation, Misuzu begins to fall in love with Ayumu and kisses her one day. Misuzu tells Ayumu that the kiss meant nothing, and Ayumu is not sure what to believe. Satsuki Azuma, a delinquent girl from Misuzu's past, shows up and begins reminding Misuzu of an incident she wants to forget, especially now that she's with Ayumu.

References

External links 
 Shoujo Manga Magazine Yuri Watch: Blue Friends by Erica Friedman
 Blue Friend Volume 1 review by Erica Friedman

Yuri (genre) anime and manga
Romance anime and manga
Shōjo manga
2010 manga
Shueisha manga
2010s LGBT literature